The 1993–94 Iraqi National Clubs First Division was the 20th season of the competition since its foundation in 1974. The league title was won by Al-Zawraa for the fifth time in their history, and they also won the Iraq FA Cup to secure the double. The top scorer, Younis Abid Ali, set a record for the most goals scored in one Iraqi Premier League season (36) which still stands today.

Al-Zawraa lost only one match out of 50, and were unbeaten for their last 38 matches consecutively. They went one more game unbeaten at the start of the 1994–95 season, completing a record 39-match unbeaten streak in the league; this record was equalled by Al-Shorta in 2019.

League table

Results

Season statistics

Top scorers

Hat-tricks

Notes
4 Player scored 4 goals

References

External links
 Iraq Football Association

Iraqi Premier League seasons
1993–94 in Iraqi football
Iraq